The Gangster is an Isaac Bell adventure tale, the ninth in that series.  The hardcover edition was released March 1, 2016.

Plot
This novel is set in 1906 in New York City and it centers around Isaac Bell, an investigator with the Van Dorn Detective Agency. Van Dorn is hired to protect clients from the Black Hand crime group. Bell puts together a group of Van Dorn's best people to find who is at the bottom of the Black Hand. Few clues exist until Bell discovers a familiar face that provides a link to the Black Hand. The Black Hand sets its sights on killing one of the top leaders of the country and Bell and his team must work to prevent this from happening."

Reviews
The Real Book Spy website had this to say about The Gangster, "I didn’t feel like The Gangster lived up to the standard that Cussler has spoiled readers with for several decades."

The historical novel society had a much more positive review of this book, saying, "Cussler fans and any reader looking for a fast-paced thriller with larger-than-life protagonists will enjoy this ninth adventure of detective Isaac Bell."

References

2016 American novels
Novels by Clive Cussler
Fiction set in 1906
G. P. Putnam's Sons books
Novels set in New York City
Collaborative novels
Michael Joseph books
Works about the American Mafia